Boat Trip or Boat trip may refer to:

 Boat Trip, 2008 Sun Araw album
 Boat Trip (film), a 2002 romantic comedy film
 Boat tour, a short trip in a small boat
 Cruising (maritime), trips of a few days or more on a boat
 A voyage on a cruise ship, ocean liner, ferry or any other maritime passenger vessel